The Broch of Cullingsburgh is an Iron Age broch located in the Shetland islands.

Location
Located on Bressay, off the east coast of mainland Shetland, Cullingsburgh Broch is situated on an elevated area of ground overlooking the Bay of Cuppa on the east coast of the island.

History

Very little is left of the broch. The later (now ruined) church of St. Mary was likely built of stones mined from it. The church of St. Mary had an associated settlement and cemetery. The site is a Scheduled Monument.

Archaeological Finds
The Pictish Bressay Stone was found near St. Mary's Church in 1852. This is an upright, schist slab with relief designs on the two broad sides and ogham inscriptions on the narrow sides. The inscription is reported to be a memorial for the daughter of a chieftain. The Bressay Stone is now on display in the National Museum of Scotland in Edinburgh, however a replica of the stone is located inside the cemetery.

Notes

References
 Royal Commission on the Ancient and Historical Monuments of Scotland, Cullingsburgh Broch
 Charlton, E (1855) 'On the ogham inscription from the island of Bressay, Shetland, 1853. Read before the Society of Antiquaries of Newcastle-upon-Tyne, April 6th, 1853', Archaeol Aeliana, 1st, vol.4: 150-156

External links
 Geograph photo and description.

Cullingsburgh
Scheduled Ancient Monuments in Shetland
Bressay